Vimala Perumal is a Malaysian filmmaker.  She is currently a Senior Lecturer at Multimedia University, in Cyberjaya, Malaysia. Her film Vedigundu Pasangge received national and international recognition.

About 
Perumal was born in 1982, Sungai Petani, Kedah, Malaysia. She completed her film studies at Multimedia University. She received a doctorate in film production and human communication from the University of Putra Malaysia becoming the first female film director in Malaysia with PhD.

Film

The Pasanga Trilogy 
Perumal directed her debut feature film, Vilaiyaatu Pasangge (Playful Folks), which released on 13 October 2011. This was the first Malaysian Tamil Movie to be played on Astro Box Office. 

She released her second feature film, Vetti Pasanga (Useless Folks) on 2 January 2014. This won two Silver Awards in International level, and broke the record for the Highest Box Office Collection during its release, for a Malaysian Tamil Movie under the Wajib Tayang Scheme.  

The third sequel in this series, Vedigundu Pasangge (Rowdy Folks), was released on 26 July 2018 in 55 theatres, and became the First Malaysian Tamil film to screen for two weeks in the United Kingdom.  It also premiered in Singapore, India, and Sri Lanka. In 2019, it won the Special Jury Award in the 30th Malaysian Film Festival. The film received the Malaysia Book of Records as the Highest Collection for Tamil Movies in Malaysia.

Recent work 
In conjunction with the Independence Day in 2016, Maxis collaborated with a few Malaysian directors to release their 360 degree camera. Perumal and Kumar produced and directed a 360 degree film for this, “Rojak Cow Cow” in YouTube.

In 2020, Perumal ventured into directing a Tamil Drama Series, TAMILETCHUMY. The series was renewed for a second season, which aired in August 2021.

Academic 
In early 2004, Perumal began teaching visual arts. In 2009, she taught the foundation course for Creative Multimedia, and became a Senior Lecturer at MMU. She later became the Head of the Humanities and Multimedia Department, and developed the curriculum for the Cinematic Arts Programme. As of 2020, she is the Editor-in-Chief of the International Journal of Creative Multimedia (IJCM).

Publications 
Book chapters:
 Tamil Film Industry in Malaysia. In Malaysian creative industry (pp. 34-36). Malaysia. 2016.
 Indian Classical Dance (Bharatanatyam) in 3D Animation, VDM Publishing House, Germany, 2010.
 The Need of Knowledge Management in Malaysian Film Industry, Lambert Academic Publishing (LAP), Germany, 2009.

Accolades 
Special Jury Award in 30th Malaysia Film Festival was awarded for Vedigundu Pasangge for becoming the first Malaysian Tamil language film to collect more than RM1 million. The film also won numerous awards in national and international film festivals with its own success. Among them are the Malaysia Book of Records for Highest Collection for Tamil Movies in Malaysia , Cinema Worldfest Awards (Musical Comedy), Calcutta International Cult Film Festival (CICFF) (Best Female Film Director) and also the South Film & Arts Academy Festival (Best Editor, Best Art Arrangement, Best Sound Arrangement), Accolade Global Film Competition and the Barcelona Planet Film Festival (Best Screenplay)

References

External links

Living people
1982 births
Malaysian film producers
Malaysian women
Malaysian film directors